Gennady Kurilenko (c. 1944–2013) was an international speedway rider from Ukraine (part of the Soviet Union at the time).

Speedway career
Kurilenko reached the final of the Speedway World Championship in the 1964 Individual Speedway World Championship.

World final appearances

Individual World Championship
 1964 –  Gothenburg, Ullevi – 8th – 7pts
 1968 -  Gothenburg, Ullevi - 4th - 11pts + 2pts
 1970 -  Wroclaw, Olympic Stadium - 14th - 2pts

World Team Cup
 1964 -  Abensberg, Abensberg Stadion (with Boris Samorodov / Igor Plekhanov / Yuri Chekranov) - 2nd - 25pts (8)
 1965 -  Kempten (with Yuri Chekranov / Igor Plekhanov / Vladimir Sokolov / Viktor Trofimov) - 4th - 7pts (2)
 1969 -  Rybnik, Rybnik Municipal Stadium (with Viktor Trofimov / Vladimir Smirnov / Valeri Klementiev / Yury Dubinin) - 3rd - 23pts (8)

References

1940s births
2013 deaths
Year of birth uncertain
Russian speedway riders